Nuova Rivista Storica is a peer-reviewed academic journal published by Società Editrice Dante Alighieri. It publishes articles on Italian, European and World history.

Editors
 Corrado Barbagallo (1917-1952)
 Gino Luzzatto (1952-1963)
 Giuseppe Martini (1963-1979)
 Alberto Boscolo (1980-1986)
 Gigliola Soldi Rondinini (1987- )

References
 Nuova rivista storica: indici generali del cinquantennio 1917-1966, Rome 1977
 Antonio Casali, Storici italiani fra le guerre. La Nuova Rivista Storica (1917-1943), Neaples 1980
 Manuela Doglio, La “Nuova Rivista Storica” e la storiografia del Novecento (1917-1945), in «Nuova Rivista Storica», LXIV (1980), pp. 334–377
 Nuova rivista storica: indici generali del venticinquennio 1967-1991, ed. by Paolo Margaroli, Rome 1997
 Gigliola Soldi Rondinini, Novant’anni, in «Nuova Rivista Storica», XCII (2008), pp. 1–20
 Giovanni Sedita, La spia degli storici. Aldo Romano e «Nuova Rivista Storica», in «Nuova Rivista Storica», XCIII (2009), pp. 713–732

External links

Publisher website

History journals
Publications established in 1917
Italian-language journals
Quarterly journals
Academic journals published by learned and professional societies